Sakleshpur, Sakleshpura or Sakleshapura is a hill station town and headquarters of Sakleshpur taluk in Hassan district in the Indian state of Karnataka.

Economy
The town lies in the Malnad region on the hills of the biodiversity hotspot, the Western Ghats. It has a temperate climate surrounded with lofty green hills full of coffee, cardamom, pepper and areca plantations. These crops which contribute mainly to the economy of the taluk are grown in the surrounding villages and the entire taluk are brought to Sakleshpur city for sale. The town lies on the National Highway 75 (NH 75) which connects the port city of Mangalore (128 km), with the capital city Bangalore (224 km) of Karnataka state.

Geography

Sakleshpur taluk is bounded by Belur taluk to the northeast, Alur taluk to the east, Dakshina Kannada district to the west, Chikkamagaluru district to the northwest and Kodagu district to the southeast and south.

The Western Ghats mountains extend along the western edge of the taluk, separating Sakleshpur from Dakshina Kannada district. The rest of the district lies on the Deccan Plateau. The Hemavathi River, a tributary of the Kaveri, drains the eastern portion of the town, originating in Chikkamagaluru district and flowing through Sakleshpur town.

Two rivers flow in western part of Sakleshpura taluk and drain through the Ghats. The Kempuhole River originates near Manjarabad Fort and flows westward to join the Netravati River, which empties into the Arabian Sea at Mangalore. The Kumaradhara River, another tributary of the Netravati, drains the southwestern portion of the taluk. These rivers form passes through the Ghats. The Bangalore-Mangalore Highway follows the Kempuhole River, as does the rail line linking Sakleshpur to Mangalore. Bisle Ghat Road follows the Kumaradhara, linking the southwestern portion of the taluk to Kulkunda and Subramanya in Dakshina Kannada.

It is around 38 kilometres from Sakleshpura town.

Biodiversity
Sakleshpur is located in the Western Ghats, a mountain range that stretches from Kerala to Gujarat. The southern range around Sakleshpur, which includes the Bisle Reserve Forest, is listed as one of the 18 bio-diversity hotspots in the world. The sub-tropical climate and heavy rains during the wet season create an environment where several unique plant and animal species flourish.

Local flora of Sakleshpur include the reddish-orange pagoda flower (Clerodendrum paniculatum), locally known as raktha pushpa (blood flower).

Gallery

Climate

Sakleshpur has Aw climate, according to the Koppen-Geiger classification.

Demographics

 India census, Sakleshpur had a population of 23,352 of which 11,558 are males while 11,794 are females. Sakleshpur has an average literacy rate of 88.47%: male literacy is 92.72%, and female literacy is 84.31%. In Sakleshpur, 11% of the population is under 6 years of age.

Manjarabad Fort
The Manjarabad Fort was constructed by Tippu Sultan. It is located on the outskirts of Sakleshpur on NH 75. It has a 8-pointed star-shaped fort on a hillock overlooking the road to Mangalore. There is a hollow entrance in the center, which is said to be the entrance of a tunnel leading to Srirangapattana. There is a mural with the fort's map at the entrance which is in excellent condition. The fort is maintained by the Department of Archeology.

See also

Hassan
Mangalore
Shiradi Ghat
Puttur
Madikeri
Somvarpet

References

Cities and towns in Hassan district
Populated places in the Western Ghats
Tourism in Karnataka
Hill stations in Karnataka